is a Japanese black-and-white anime series created by Ushio Souji, an alias of Tomio Sagisu. Yadamon is also famous for its manga adaptation, which was the second professional work of Go Nagai.

External links
 

1967 anime television series debuts
1967 manga
Children's manga
Comedy anime and manga
Go Nagai
Shōnen manga